Arthropods are covered with a tough, resilient integument or exoskeleton of chitin. Generally the exoskeleton will have thickened areas in which the chitin is reinforced or stiffened by materials such as minerals or hardened proteins. This happens in parts of the body where there is a need for rigidity or elasticity. Typically the mineral crystals, mainly calcium carbonate, are deposited among the chitin and protein molecules in a process called biomineralization. The crystals and fibres interpenetrate and reinforce each other, the minerals supplying the hardness and resistance to compression, while the chitin supplies the tensile strength. Biomineralization occurs mainly in crustaceans. In insects and arachnids, the main reinforcing materials are various proteins hardened by linking the fibres in processes called sclerotisation and the hardened proteins are called sclerotin. The dorsal tergum, ventral sternum, and the lateral pleura form the hardened plates or sclerites of a typical body segment.

In either case, in contrast to the carapace of a tortoise or the cranium of a vertebrate, the exoskeleton has little ability to grow or change its form once it has matured. Except in special cases, whenever the animal needs to grow, it moults, shedding the old skin after growing a new skin from beneath.

Microscopic structure 

A typical arthropod exoskeleton is a multi-layered structure with four functional regions:   epicuticle, procuticle, epidermis and basement membrane.  Of these, the epicuticle is a multi-layered external barrier that, especially in terrestrial arthropods, acts as a barrier against desiccation.  The strength of the exoskeleton is provided by the underlying procuticle, which is in turn secreted by the epidermis.  Arthropod cuticle is a biological composite material, consisting of two main portions: fibrous chains of alpha-chitin within a matrix of silk-like and globular proteins, of which the best-known is the rubbery protein called resilin.  The relative abundance of these two main components varies from approximately 50/50 to 80/20 chitin protein, with softer parts of the exoskeleton having a higher proportion of chitin.

The cuticle is soft when first secreted, but it soon hardens as required, in a process of sclerotization. The process is poorly understood, but it involves forms of tanning in which  phenolic chemicals crosslink protein molecules or anchor them to surrounding molecules such as chitins. Part of the effect is to make the tanned material hydrophobic.  By varying the types of interaction between the proteins and chitins, the insect metabolism produces regions of exoskeleton that differ in their wet and dry behaviour, their colour and their mechanical properties.

In addition to the chitinous-proteinaceous composite of the cuticle, many crustaceans, some myriapods and the extinct trilobites further impregnate the cuticle with mineral salts, above all calcium carbonate, which can make up to 40% of the cuticle. The armoured product commonly has great mechanical strength.

Mechanical properties 
The two layers of the cuticle have different properties.
The outer layer is where most of the thickening, biomineralization and sclerotisation takes place, and its material tends to be strong under compressive stresses, though weaker under tension. When a rigid region fails under stress, it does so by cracking.  The inner layer is not as highly sclerotised, and is correspondingly softer but tougher; it resists tensile stresses but is liable to failure under compression.

This combination is especially effective in resisting predation, as predators tend to exert compression on the outer layer, and tension on the inner.

Its degree of sclerotisation or mineralisation determines how the cuticle responds to deformation.  Below a certain degree of deformation changes of shape or dimension of the cuticle are elastic and the original shape returns after the stress is removed.  Beyond that level of deformation, non-reversible, plastic deformation occurs until finally the cuticle cracks or splits. Generally, the less sclerotised the cuticle, the greater the deformation required to damage the cuticle irreversibly. On the other hand, the more heavily the cuticle is armoured, the greater the stress required to deform it harmfully.

Segmentation 

As a rule, the arthropod exoskeleton is divided into different functional units, each comprising a series of grouped segments. Such a group is called a tagma, and the tagmata are adapted to different functions in a given arthropod body. For example, tagmata of insects include the head, which is a fused capsule, the thorax as nearly a fixed capsule, and the abdomen usually divided into a series of articulating segments. Each segment has sclerites according to its requirements for external rigidity; for example, in the larva of some flies, there are none at all and the exoskeleton is effectively all membranous; the abdomen of an adult fly is covered with light sclerites connected by joints of membranous cuticle. In some beetles most of the joints are so tightly connected, that the body is practically in an armoured, rigid box. 
However, in most Arthropoda the bodily tagmata are so connected and jointed with flexible cuticle and muscles that they have at least some freedom of movement, and many such animals, such as the Chilopoda or the larvae of mosquitoes are very mobile indeed. 
In addition, the limbs of arthropods are jointed, so characteristically that the very name "Arthropoda" literally means "jointed legs" in reflection of the fact.  The internal surface of the exoskeleton is often infolded, forming a set of structures called apodemes that serve for the attachment of muscles, and functionally amounting to endoskeletal components. They are highly complex in some groups, particularly in Crustacea.

Ecdysis 

The chemical and physical nature of the arthropod exoskeleton limits its ability to stretch or change shape as the animal grows. In some special cases, such as the abdomens of termite queens and honeypot ants means that continuous growth of arthropods is not possible. Therefore, growth is periodic and concentrated into a period of time when the exoskeleton is shed, called moulting or ecdysis, which is under the control of a hormone called ecdysone. Moulting is a complex process that is invariably dangerous for the arthropod involved. Before the old exoskeleton is shed, the cuticle separates from the epidermis through a process called apolysis. New cuticle is excreted by the underlying epidermis, and mineral salts are usually withdrawn from the old cuticle for re-use. After the old cuticle is shed, the arthropod typically pumps up its body (for example, by air or water intake) to allow the new cuticle to expand to a larger size: the process of hardening by dehydration of the cuticle then takes place. A newly molted arthropod typically is pale in colour; in that state it is said to be teneral or a callow. It generally darkens or otherwise gains colour as its exoskeleton hardens.

Although the process of ecdysis is metabolically risky and expensive, it does have some advantages. For one thing it permits a complex development cycle of metamorphosis in which young animals may be totally different from older phases, such as the nauplius larvae of crustaceans, the nymphs of say, the Odonata, or the larvae of Endopterygota, such as maggots of flies. Such larval stages commonly have ecological and life cycle roles totally different from those of the mature animals. Secondly, often a major injury in one phase, such as the loss of a leg from an insect nymph, or a claw from a young crab, can be repaired after one or two stages of ecdysis. Similarly, delicate parts that need periodic replacement, such as the outer surfaces of the eye lenses of spiders, or the urticating hairs of caterpillars, can be shed, making way for new structures.

References 

Exoskeleton
Biomechanics
Skeletal system